Idactus minimus is a species of beetle in the family Cerambycidae. It was described by Teocchi and Sudre in 2002.

References

Ancylonotini
Beetles described in 2002